Di Lauro or DiLauro is an Italian surname. Notable people with the surname include:

 Marco Di Lauro, Italian gangster of the Di Lauro clan
 Cosimo Di Lauro, Italian gangster of the Di Lauro clan
 Paolo Di Lauro, Italian gangster of the Di Lauro clan
 Christian DiLauro, American football player
 Jack DiLauro, American baseball player

See also
 Pago del Vallo di Lauro, town in Campania, Italy

Italian-language surnames